The George Houston House, also known as the "Wall-Houston House", is a private historic home between Mooresville and Davidson, North Carolina in Iredell County that was built in 1818.    The original portion of the home was built with log construction, and several later additions, including a 19th-century ell.  In its nomination, the home's original Federal-style construction was noted as being highly representative of the idiosyncrasies found in home designs in Iredell County and the North Carolina Piedmont during the Federal era. The property on which the home sits also contains several historic outbuildings, including an early log barn.

It was listed on the National Register of Historic Places in 1980.

References

See also
 – A collection containing photographic slides documenting the house.
 – Archival website containing digitized versions of images of the home in various stages of disrepair and restoration.

Houses on the National Register of Historic Places in North Carolina
Houses completed in 1818
Federal architecture in North Carolina
Houses in Iredell County, North Carolina
National Register of Historic Places in Iredell County, North Carolina